Temata is a surname. Notable people with the surname include:

Farrell Temata ( 1944–2013), New Zealand rugby union player and coach
Karl Temata (born 1978), New Zealand rugby league player
Sonya Apa Temata, New Zealand activist and nurse
Tessa Temata ( 1967–2019), New Zealand diplomat